Karthik Dial Seytha Yenn is a 2020 Indian Tamil-language short film written and directed by Gautham Vasudev Menon. A sequel to his Vinnaithaandi Varuvaayaa (2010), it stars Silambarasan and Trisha reprising their roles from that film. The film was released on 21 May 2020 on YouTube.

Plot 
Filmmaker Karthik is at home during the COVID-19 pandemic in Tamil Nadu without work as theatres are shut down, affecting his career as a screenwriter, While experiencing writer's block, he hesitantly calls his ex-girlfriend Jessie, who fled the effects of the pandemic in New York City and is under lockdown in Kerala. Jessie, who is now married to Roy with two children, answers Karthik's call and tells him about their lives during the lockdown situation. In the conversation, Karthik again confesses his love for Jessie and says he still needs her, despite knowing that she is married with children. But Jessie refuses his proposal as she has moved on with her husband and refers to him as "her third child". Jessie supports Karthik emotionally and says that he is a great artist. After the phone call, Karthik resumes his writing and composes Kamal & Kadambari: A Love Story.

Cast 
Silambarasan as Karthik Sivakumar
Trisha as Jessie

Production 
Gautham Vasudev Menon was working on the sequel of Vinnaithaandi Varuvaayaa which was titled Ondraga, a road movie which would focus on Karthik and his best friends from college travelling to the United States to attend a wedding ten years after the events of the first film. With Silambarasan reprising his role from the earlier film, and pulling out prominent names from South Indian film fraternity, the film entered production in February 2018. However, the project did not materialise due to various reasons. In April 2020, Silambarasan and Gautham Menon started shooting for the short film based on the characters from Vinnaithaandi Varuvayaa, eventually titled as Karthik Dial Seytha Yenn. The film was primarily shot using an iPhone and filmed indoors due to the restrictions in order to curb COVID-19. A. R. Rahman composed background music for the short film.

Release 
The teaser of the short was unveiled by actress Trisha through social media handles on 7 May 2020. The short film was released through the YouTube channel of Ondraga Entertainment on 21 May 2020.

Reception 
Kirubhakar Purushothaman of Cinema Express said, "The filmmaking is minimalistic with not-so-seamless cuts. Of course, one is expected to cut slack for the film given the immense constraints the team has made this under. But it's a paradox when you realise there would have been no Karthik Dial Seytha Yenn without the coronavirus or the constraints." Baradwaj Rangan of Film Companion wrote "A reflection on the 12-odd minutes spent with the characters that continue to haunt us, even after 10 years." Manoj Kumar R. of The Indian Express stated "Karthik Dial Seytha Yenn is nothing but Gautham Menon giving himself a much-needed pep-talk in front of the mirror before he begins to write his next big film." Srivatsan S. of The Hindu wrote the film as "a letter of unrequited love" and called that "even after ten years of the first film, the characters linger in the mind and with a simple storyline being minimal and realistic". Behindwoods wrote "GVM takes us on a nostalgic ride with ‘Karthik Dial Seytha Yenn’, with Jessie and Karthik giving hope on life. A neat watch and a feel-good short film."

References

External links 

2020 films
2020 romantic drama films
2020 short films
2020s Tamil-language films
Films about the COVID-19 pandemic
Films directed by Gautham Vasudev Menon
Films scored by A. R. Rahman
Indian romantic drama films
Indian sequel films
Indian short films